Sleep On It is a half-hour show that premiered on HGTV on January 1, 2008 at 10 pm (eastern). The show will feature families looking to buy a house who get to "try" the house before they make a final decision.

In each episode, the potential buyers will first look at two possible homes.  From those two, they will choose one to give a trial run, by living and sleeping in the house for 24 hours, before deciding if they want to buy it.

The show is narrated by Brian Davis.

See also
To Buy or Not to Buy (a similar program in Britain)

References

External links
Sleep On It on HGTV

HGTV original programming
2000s American reality television series
2010s American reality television series
2008 American television series debuts